Simeon Dyankov (also Djankov; born July 13, 1970) is a Bulgarian economist. From 2009 to 2013, he was the deputy prime minister and minister of finance of Bulgaria in the government of Boyko Borisov. Before his cabinet appointment, he was the chief economist of the finance and private sector vice-presidency of the World Bank.

He was an associate editor of the Journal of Comparative Economics from 2004 to 2009. Dyankov was a chairman of the board of the European Bank for Reconstruction and Development. From 2013 to 2015, he was appointed rector of the New Economic School in Moscow. Since November 2015, Dyankov has been co-director for policy of the Financial Markets Group at the London School of Economics.

At the World Bank, Dyankov was director of development economics. He was involved in the publication of Women Business and the Law, World Development Reports and Doing Business reports. The Doing Business reports were discontinued after an inquiry documented how Dyankov, along with then World Bank CEO Georgieva, pressured staff to make data for China and Saudi Arabia look better. The Board of the IMF, after a separate review, found that Georgieva had not "played an improper role". Georgieva was managing director of the IMF at the time. An improved 'Doing Business analysis is proposed in Fraser Institute's 2022 Economic Freedom of the World report. 

Since April 2020, Dyankov has been policy director at the Financial Markets Group at the London School of Economics. He has also been a senior fellow at the Peterson Institute for International Economics. He has written widely on the economic impact of the 2022 Russian invasion of Ukraine. This invasion has resulted in significant loss of human capital, destruction of agricultural trading infrastructure, huge damages to productive capacity, including through the loss of electricity, and a reduction in private consumption of more than a third relative to pre-war levels. The all-out aggression requires an all-out response by the European Union to win the war.

Early life
Dyankov was born in Lovech, Bulgaria, on July 13, 1970. He attended Ekzarh Yosif I high school in Lovech (1984–1989). In 1989, he passed the entrance exam to the Karl Marx Institute of Economics (now University of National and World Economy). He holds a 1997 doctorate from the University of Michigan, on the topic "Three Essays on the Economics of Transition". His main thesis advisor was Alan Deardorff.

Academia
Dyankov has published in journals such as American Economic Review, the Quarterly Journal of Economics, the Journal of Political Economy, the Journal of Finance and the Journal of Financial Economics. He co-edited the book The Resolution of Financial Distress with Stijn Claessens and Ashoka Mody.

Dyankov was one of the creators of the Human Capital Index, first published in the World Development Report 2019, which he co-directed. The academic study describing the index construction was published in the leading science journal Nature.

Harvard Kennedy School
After leaving the government of Boyko Borisov, Dyankov joined the Harvard Kennedy School as visiting faculty. His teaching is focused on the politics of development. At Harvard, Dyankov edited a special issue of the Journal of Comparative Economics on the 25th anniversary from the start of transition in Eastern Europe. Jointly with Anders Aslund at the Atlantic Council, he co-wrote a book on the transformation from communism. The book contains chapters by Leszek Balcerowicz on Poland, Václav Klaus on the Czech Republic, Lajos Bokros on Hungary, Ivan Mikloš on Slovakia and Mart Laar on Estonia.

New Economic School
In October 2013, it was announced that the board of directors of the private Moscow-based university New Economic School (NES), also known as the Russian Economic School, had approved Dyankov as its rector. During his tenure as rector, the New Economic School moved to a new campus in the Skolkovo Innovation Center. Sergei Guriev was the Rector at New Economic School (NES) until he resigned on 30 April 2013 and fled to France. In July 2014, Dyankov himself was put on a draft list under Russian foreign agent law and shortly resigned.

London School of Economics
Dyankov is the policy director at the Financial Markets Group, responsible for a large research project on post-Covid recovery. The project shows that the pandemic caught governments in developing economies off guard, and that governments in Africa reacted in ways that pushed more people into the informal economy. In advanced economies the pandemic opened a larger gender gap in employment, while bankruptcies actually fell due to generous government support schemes, further expanding the inequality of opportunity between men and women.

His research is also on the rising income inequality in Russia, including due to autarky. The Russian economy looks inward, with imports down nearly 20% in 2022. Previous periods of autarkic policies in Russian and Soviet history have resulted in economic backwardness. Vladimir Putin's presidency has accelerated the rise of Russian oligarchs:"Closeness to Putin substitutes for the rule of law that usually protects private property in mature democracies. Such protection is mercurial, however. On occasion, billionaires fall out of favor and their assets are up for grabs."

Think tanks
In 2008, Dyankov established the think-tank Ideas42, jointly with Antoinette Schoar (MIT Sloan), Eldar Shafir (Princeton) and Sendhil Mullainathan (Harvard). Dyankov joined the Peterson Institute for International Economics in 2013 and re-joined it in 2020, working primarily on former socialist economies. In a 2016 lecture at the Kyiv School of Economics he argued that: “The one reform that is the most difficult to figure out how to do in Ukraine, is reducing the role of the oligarchs.  Even after 25 of transition in a number of countries, including Russia and Ukraine, the oligarchs still control not just business life but also public life, which prevented major political and economic changes.”

World Bank
Dyankov has worked for the World Bank since 1995. In 1997, he participated in a World Bank enterprise restructuring project in Georgia. For his work in the transformation of the Georgian economy, he was awarded an honorary doctorate from the Free University of Tbilisi in June 2021. Dyankov also led World Bank projects on state-owned enterprise restructuring in Moldova. This work restarted after Russia’s invasion of Ukraine, under the aegis of the European Commission, with a state-owned enterprise strategy published in February 2023. 

1997 Asian Financial Crisis
Dyankov participated in several World Bank financial sector restructuring projects during the 1997 Asian financial crisis.  Based on these projects, he published a series of articles on corporate governance in East Asia with Stijn Claessens." Disentangling the incentive and entrenchment effects of large shareholdings ", Journal of Finance, via JStor. Published 7 December 2002. 

The World Development Report 2002World Development Report 2002 analyzed how to build effective institutions. The study was guided by Joseph Stiglitz, with Simeon Djankov as a principal author. Several background papers, including by Nobel Prize winners Robert Shiller, Amartya Sen and Gabriel Garcia Marquez, were published in academic journals or books.

The World Development Report 2019
The World Development Report 2019 was led by Djankov and Federica Saliola. A summary of the main arguments and data is provided in the Journal of International Affairs. Fears that robots will take jobs from people have dominated the discussion over the future of work, but the World Development Report 2019 finds that on balance this appears to be unfounded. 

Doing Business report and scandal
Dyankov is the creator of the annual Doing Business report, the top-selling publication of the World Bank Group. The report came out of joint research work with Professor Andrei Shleifer at Harvard University and was inspired by Dyankov's experience in overly-regulated socialist economies. In a 2016 article for the Journal of Economic Perspectives, Dyankov explains how Doing Business started and lists academic papers that serve as background research for the report.

The report has its origins in a 2002 paper published in the Quarterly Journal of Economics under the title "The Regulation of Entry". The study presents data on the regulation of entry of start-up firms in 85 countries covering the number of procedures, official time and official cost that a start-up must bear before it can operate legally. The main findings of the paper are that: "Countries with heavier regulation of entry have higher corruption and larger unofficial economies, but no better quality of public or private goods. Countries with more democratic and limited governments have lighter regulation of entry." The paper became widely known, with over five thousand academic references, because it provides quantitative evidence that entry regulation benefits politicians and bureaucrats without adding value to the private sector or granting any additional protection.Citations of "The Regulation of Entry", accessed February 7, 2023

The reports were discontinued by the World Bank, following the release of an independent audit of the data irregularities. The audit documented how Dyankov, along with the World Bank CEO Georgieva, pressured staff to manipulate the results, in particular making data for China and Saudi Arabia look better. The board of the IMF, after a separate review, found that Georgieva had not "played an improper role". Georgieva was managing director of the IMF at the time.
An improved Doing Business analysis is proposed in Fraser Institute's 2022 Economic Freedom of the World report. This analysis outlines the start of a new report, to be housed at a top research institution.

Women Business and the Law
The World Bank's annual study, Women Business and the Law, was inspired by the book Women and the Law. The study is based on methodology described in Djankov, Pinelopi Koujianou Goldberg and Marie Hyland in Gendered Laws and Women in the Workforce.

Human Capital Index
The Human Capital Index is an annual measurement prepared by the World Bank. The applications to measuring human capital are developed by Noam Angrist, Simeon Djankov, Pinelopi Koujianou Goldberg and Harry Patrinos in the scientific journal Nature. These findings are extended in a 2021 article. The index is used in country studies of employment and wages, for example in Ukraine after Russia's invasion.

Political career
Dyankov has been both deputy prime minister and minister of finance of Bulgaria.

Minister of finance of Bulgaria
On July 27, 2009, Dyankov became minister of finance of Bulgaria. He reduced budget spending and managed to cut the budget deficit for 2009 to 4.4%. In 2010, Bulgaria met the Maastricht criteria – 3%, falling to 2% in 2011 and 0.45% in 2012. On December 1, 2009, Standard and Poors upgraded Bulgaria's investment outlook from "negative" to "stable", the only country in the European Union to receive an upgrade that year.

On numerous occasions as minister, Dyankov stated that two successive terms were needed to complete the reforms that would lead Bulgaria from poorest to middle-income country by Central European standards. Soon after, Parliament adopted the so-called "Golden Rules" in the organic budget law: the government cannot surpass a deficit of 2% of GDP and a debt-to-GDP ratio of 40% in any given year. Dyankov was a member of the GERB cabinet, but not a party member.

At the second GERB party congress, Dyankov urged delegates to lead such policies that the party would win a second term with full majority in parliament. This was needed, he said, to complete the reforms that would lead Bulgaria from poorest to middle-income country by Central European standards. Soon after, Parliament adopted the so-called Golden Rules in the organic budget law: the government cannot surpass a deficit of 2% of GDP and a debt-to-GDP ratio of 40% in any given year. Dyankov believes in his role as an expert rather than a politician and even though he is a member of the GERB cabinet, he is not a member of the GERB party.

In February 2013, Dyankov resigned in protest of the decision by the prime minister, Boyko Borisov, to advance subsidies to farmers. On February 20, 2013, Borisov announced the resignation of the government due to increasing levels of violence in the protests about high electricity prices. Dyankov continued as finance minister until a caretaker government was formed a month later.

Flat tax
Dyankov was a proponent of the flat tax, introduced in Bulgaria in 2009 and expanded to dividend tax in 2010–2011 during his term in office. Bulgaria is the only country with a ten percent rate on personal, corporate and dividend taxes.

Eurozone Entry
On two occasions during Simeon Djankov’s term in office, in 2010 and 2013, Bulgaria attempted to enter the European Exchange Rate Mechanism, the precursor to the Eurozone. In both cases the European debt crisis prevented such entry, first due to the crisis in Greece and later in Portugal.  The attempts at joining the Eurozone elicited strikes in early 2013 and demands for Djankov’s dismissal.  This experience is analyzed in a 2016 book, co-authored with Anders Aslund. 

Bulgaria’s entry into the European Exchange Rate Mechanism finally took place in 2020, while entry into the Eurozone has been postponed till 2025 at the earliest.  Dyankov has proposed policies for inflation-abatement in order to meet the Euro convergence criteria.

Selected publications
 
 Hoekman, Bernard, and Djankov, Simeon (1997), "Determinants of the Export Structure of Countries in Central and Eastern Europe",  World Bank Economic Review'', 11, 3: 471–87.

References

External links

 Deputy Prime Minister of Bulgaria
 Ministry of Finance, Bulgaria
 

Deputy prime ministers of Bulgaria
Finance ministers of Bulgaria
Bulgarian economists
Bulgarian conservatives
1970 births
Living people
People from Lovech
University of Michigan alumni
Bulgarian emigrants to the United States
Peterson Institute for International Economics
Harvard Kennedy School faculty